"Move (You Make Me Feel So Good)" is a song by American electronica musician Moby, with a chorus sampling from Loleatta Holloway's 1980 song "Love Sensation". It was first released as the title track on Moby's extended play Move, which was issued on August 31, 1993 as his first release on Mute Records in the United Kingdom and on Elektra Records in the United States. It hit number one on the US Billboard Hot Dance Music/Club Play chart and number 21 on the UK Singles Chart.

"Move" was released as a two-track single from the EP in certain territories, featuring the EP version of the song and a "Disco Threat" mix of the same song. The song "All That I Need Is to Be Loved" from the Move EP was also issued as a single and later included in a different version on Moby's third studio album Everything Is Wrong (1995). Remixes of "Move" were also featured on the Everything Is Wrong remix album (1996).

Critical reception 
Andy Beevers from Music Week gave "Move" five out of five and named it Pick of the Week in the category of Dance. He wrote, "This EP is Moby's first release on Mute and is shaping up to be a big hit. Already massive on the nation's dancefloors, the title track is a charging anthemic house track, identified by its "You make me feel so good" female vocal. The various mixes, including MK's excellent Blades remix, are ensuring widespread appeal." Sam Wood from Philadelphia Inquirer declared it as "a fiercely energetic dance-floor anthem". Charles Aaron from Spin commented, "The only card-carrying human in the techno scene takes a generically transcendent house-diva vocal and plunges it into a sampled torment of biblical proportions, a war between flesh, spirit, and technology that exudes skepticism and ecstasy in equal spurts. I think I love this guy."

Track listing

Single release

Personnel 
Credits for Move adapted from album liner notes.

 Moby – engineering, production, writing
 Curt Frasca – mixing on "Move (You Make Me Feel So Good)"
 Rozz Morehead – vocals on "Move (You Make Me Feel So Good)"
 Carole Sylvan – vocals on "Move (You Make Me Feel So Good)"

Artwork and design
 Barbara Lambert – design
 Damien Loeb – video photography

Charts

Weekly charts

Year-end charts

References

External links 
 
 

1993 singles
Moby songs
Songs written by Moby
1993 EPs
Mute Records EPs
Elektra Records EPs